Manitharil Ithanai Nirangala! is a 1978 Indian Tamil-language film directed by R. C. Sakthi and starring Kamal Haasan, Sridevi and Murali Mohan The film was released on Diwali 1978, coinciding with Sigappu Rojakkal on the same day too (also starring Kamal Haasan & Sridevi). Despite the film's clash, this particular picture did well above average business. This movie marked the Tamil debut for Telugu actor, Murali Mohan and Shyam's musical score features a couple of hit songs – "Ponne Boomiyadi" and "Mazhai tharumo En megam".

Plot 

Santha is an orphaned young woman who tries to find a job in Madras to survive. She is exploited by a crook and is mistakenly dubbed by the police as a sex worker. She returns to her native village and starts living with her old friend Devaki. Devaki's husband is the belligerent but soft-hearted Velu who runs a cycle-repair shop. Santha relishes her life in the village with Devaki and Velu but things take a turn when the village station-master Mohan falls in love with her. Santha is reluctant to reciprocate due to her past which also returns to haunt her in the form of the inspector who had once arrested her in Madras and is now transferred to her village and also through Mohan's father who had once encountered her in a dubious situation. Whether Santha is able to transcend her unpleasant past and restore normalcy in her life forms the rest of the story.

Cast 
Kamal Haasan as Velu
Sridevi as Santha
Murali Mohan as Mohan
Major Sundarrajan as Mohan's father
Sathyapriya as Devaki
P. R. Varalakshmi
K. A. Thangavelu
Suruli Rajan
Manorama
Sudhakar

Soundtrack 
The music was composed by Shyam.

References

External links 
 

1970s Tamil-language films
1978 films
Films directed by R. C. Sakthi
Films scored by Shyam (composer)